Coiled-coil domain containing 109B (CCDC109B) is a potential calcium uniporter protein found in the membrane of human cells and is encoded by the CCDC109B gene.  While CCDC109B is a transmembrane protein it is unclear if it is located within the cell membrane or mitochondrial membrane.



Gene information 
CCDC109B is located at 4q25 and is 128,520 base pairs in length.  CCDC109B contains eight exons and is located on the positive strand of chromosome four. CCDC109B has nine transcript variants due to alternative splicing.  The unspliced version of this gene is the longest and most common variant found in human cells and is 1298 base pairs in length.

Protein information 
When translated, the CCDC109B protein is composed of 336 amino acids and has a molecular weight of 39.1 kDa.  The 3' end of this protein is highly conserved and contains domains crucial for protein function.

Protein domains 
Domain of Unknown Function 607 (DUF607): The function of this domain is largely unknown, although it may serve as a calcium transporter when CCDC109B forms homo-oligomers.  DUF607 is conserved in orthologs and is located closer to the 3' end of this protein, even though DUF607 is present for most of the protein's length.

Transmembrane Region: CCDC109B contains two transmembrane regions, located within DUF607, making it a multipass membrane protein.  Since there are two transmembrane regions, both the N-terminus and C-terminus are located on one side of the membrane and have been localized to the cytosolic side of the cell membrane.

DIME Motif: This motif is a completely conserved region found in all orthologs of this protein and is found within DUF607 and between the transmembrane domains.  The DIME motif is a sequence of 23 amino acids that has the sequence: QxGxLAxLTWWxYSWDIMEPVTYF, where letters correspond to actual amino acid residue and "x" represents amino acids that are not conserved within this sequence.  Throughout the entire CCDC109B protein there are no other conserved amino acid sequences that are greater than three amino acids in length.  The DIME Motif has a hypothesized role in calcium transport and is most likely essential in DUF607.

Post-translational modifications

Phosphorylation sites
The CCDC109B protein contains several likely phosphorylation sites on serine, threonine, and tyrosine residues. 
Serine Phosphorylation Sites: Amino acid positions 77, 213, 315, and 322.
Threonine Phosphorylation Site: Amino acid position 53.
Tyrosine Phosphorylation Site: Amino acid position 274.

Sumoylation site
There is one likely sumoylation site within CCDC109B at amino acid residue 306, which is a lysine.   This residue is highly conserved among orthologs.

Tertiary structure
Although it is known that CCDC109B is a transmembrane protein the proper folding of its N-terminus and C-terminus is unclear.

Homology 
CCDC109B shows conservation in vertebrates, including mammals, birds, reptiles, and amphibians.  There appears to be some conservation in earlier organisms such as flies, worms, and plants, but the percent identity is very low and these organisms have many orthologus structures that may not be CCDC109B.  The orthologs found in non-vertebrate organisms may also actually be the paralog of CCDC109B which is still producing some identity to CCDC109B.

The table below shows CCDC109B conservation among vertebrate organisms:

Paralog of CCDC109B 
CCDC109B has a single paralog in the human genome.  This paralog is CCDC109A, which is more commonly known as Mitochondrial Calcium Uniporter (MCU)  MCU is located in the inner membrane of the mitochondrion and is found as an oligomer that transports calcium ions into the mitochondria.  MCU is an essential component of the mitochondrial membrane and silencing MCU abolishes calcium uptake.  The DIME motif, which is also conserved in CCDC109B, is responsible for calcium uptake and a mutation in this region inhibits this function. CCDC109B and MCU share a 43% identity in which the DIME motif is fully conserved.

Expression profile 

CCDC109B is expressed at high levels in the immune system and the circulatory system.  CCDC109B is expressed in B-cells, Dendritic Cells, T-Cells, and Natural Killer Cells.  CCDC109B expression is not present in human adipose tissue, adrenal glands, bladder, bone marrow, ear, esophagus, larynx, parathyroid, pituitary gland, spleen, thyroid, trachea, or umbilical cord tissues.

Role in disease 
CCDC109B may contribute to a number of diseases including various lymphomas and leukemias.  Changes in CCDC109B expression are also present in other diseases such as glioblastomas, Daudi Burkitt's lymphoma, Duchenne muscular dystrophy, breast carcinomas, and promyelocytic leukemia HL-60. CCDC109B may also contribute to atopic dermatitis skin lesions and Job's Syndrome.  However, the mechanisms behind the role of CCDC109B in these diseases are unclear and not well characterized through research.

Protein-protein interaction

Transcription factors
CCDC109B has a promoter region that contains sites for transcription factor binding. This promoter region is approximately 500 nucleotides long and is located just prior to the start of translation.  Notable transcription factors that bind CCDC109B include:
Fork Head Domain Factors (FKHD)
Myeloid Zinc Finger 1 Factors (MZF1)
Pleomorphic Adenoma Gene (PLAG)
C2H2 Zinc Finger Transcription Factors 2 (ZF02)
Vertebrate SMAD Family of Transcription Factors (SMAD)
Twist Subfamily of Class B bHLH Transcription Factors (HAND)
CCAAT/Enhance Binding Protein (CEBP)
Nuclear Factor of Activated T-Cells (NFAT)

Cellular proteins
CCDC109B interacts with ZBTB16, which is a zinc-finger transcription factor and has a probable role in protein degradation.  CCDC109B's interaction with ZBTB16 was determined by a yeast two-hybrid screen  It is still unclear how CCDC109B interacts with ZBTB16.

Other proteins that CCDC109B interact with are currently unknown.

References

External links